The following list compiles known earthquakes that have caused one or more fatalities since 1900. The list incorporates high-quality earthquake source (i.e., origin time, location and earthquake magnitude) and fatality information from several sources.

Earthquake locations are taken from the Centennial Catalog and the updated Engdahl, van der Hilst and Buland earthquake catalog, which is complete to December 2005. From January 2006, earthquake locations are from the United States Geological Survey’s Preliminary Determination of Epicenters (PDE) monthly listing. Preferred magnitudes are moment magnitudes taken from the Global Centroid Moment Tensor Database and its predecessor, the Harvard Centroid Moment Tensor Database. Where these magnitude estimates are unavailable, the preferred magnitude estimate is taken from the Centennial Catalog and the PDE.

Five columns of fatality estimates are provided. The first two columns are derived from the PDE monthly catalog and indicate deaths resulting from earthquake shaking only (i.e., from partial or total building collapse), and total fatalities resulting from earthquake shaking and secondary effects, such as tsunami, landslide, fire, liquefaction or other factors (e.g., heart failure). Where these secondary effects are reported, they are indicated by “T”, “L”, “F” or “Lq”, respectively. Fatality estimates in the PDE are generally obtained from official sources (e.g., local or national government officials, humanitarian agencies, emergency management agencies, etc.) or media reports within days to weeks after the earthquake. The PDE catalog is not updated if more detailed information becomes available after its final publication, usually four months after the earthquake.

The third fatality column is taken from the Utsu catalog of deadly earthquakes, and generally represents the total deaths resulting from an earthquake. The Utsu catalog is complete up until late 2003. The fourth column is derived from the Emergency Events Database (EM-DAT). EM-DAT has been developed and maintained by the Centre for Research on the Epidemiology of Disasters at the Brussels campus of the University of Louvain, Belgium and is a global, multi-hazard (e.g., earthquake, cyclone, drought, flood, volcano, extreme temperatures, etc.) database of human impacts and economic losses. Earthquake source parameters in the EM-DAT are often absent, incomplete, or erroneous. Consequently, several events may be missed in the automated catalog associations. Furthermore, where the impact of an earthquake spans political boundaries, database entries are often subdivided by country. For significant events, the observed fatalities are aggregated and manually associated.

The final fatality column is for other sources of shaking deaths and indicates improved fatality estimates from official reports and detailed scholarly studies, where available.

The death tolls presented below vary widely in quality and in many cases are estimates only, particularly for the most catastrophic events that result in high fatalities. Note that in some cases, fatalities have been documented, but no numerical value of deaths is given. In these cases, fatality estimates are left blank. Many of the events listed with no numerical value are aftershocks where additional fatalities are aggregated with the main shock.

 * Most fatalities attributed to tsunami

See also
For death tolls of other natural disasters or significant historical earthquakes that predate 1900, see:

List of natural disasters by death toll
List of earthquakes

References

External links
Earthquake magnitude scales
Online PDE earthquake search
Global Centroid Moment Tensor search
National Geophysical Data Center Significant Earthquake Database
EM-DAT International Disaster Database
Online Utsu catalogue search
Visualization of most powerful and deadliest earthquakes since 1900 Treemap by “The Hive Group”

1900